Bola (meaning Ball in Indonesian) was an Indonesia sports newspaper, published in Jakarta by Kompas Gramedia. It was founded in 1984 as a pull-out section inside Kompas daily, and was then published separately. In 1997, it moved to twice editions a week, and since 2010 it was published three editions a week. Issues usually had 48 pages (Monday and Thursday) and 32 pages (Saturday).

Starting 7 June 2013, Bola was also published its daily version, called Harian Bola (Bola Daily). The daily was short-lived, ceased publication on 31 October 2015 and moved back to three editions per week.

On 26 October 2018, the tabloid published its last issue — Bola brand currently only exists in its online portal Bolasport.com. Before its final issue, Kompas Gramedia published another daily sports newspaper Super Ball (under Tribun Network newspaper chain), which was first published in 2014 and is still in publication. The Super Ball online portal, which was originally a subdomain of Tribunnews.com, is currently become subdomain of Bola  portal.

Tabloid 
The last version of Bola covered a number of sporting competitions and events, including:
 The Indonesian Super League
 Various European Leagues and competitions, including Premier League, La Liga, Serie A, UEFA Champions League, UEFA Europa League, Bundesliga, Ligue 1 and Eredivisie
 Various international football leagues
 Formula One racing
 Grand Prix motorcycle racing
 Boxing
 Basketball
 Tennis
 Badminton
 The Olympic Games
 Various other sporting events, depending on on-going competitions

Key People
 Sumohadi Marsis
 Ignatius Sunito
 Ian Situmorang
 Lilianto Apriadi
 Arief Kurniawan
 Dedi Rinaldi
 Arief Natakusumah
 Eko Widodo
 Amien Rais
 Rano Karno
 Abdurrahman Wahid

Covers
List Of Football Players Appeared on Tabloid Bola
 Lionel Messi (22 March 2005, 25 November 2005, 5 December 2008, 24 January 2013, 29 April 2013, 26 September 2013, 8 January 2015, 9 July 2015, 7 January 2016, 7 March 2017, 21 March 2017)
 Gabriel Batistuta (20 November 1998, 30 May 2000, 19 January 2001, 9 February 2001, 27 April 2001, 25 May 2001, 8 February 2002, 31 January 2003)
 Alessandro Del Piero (March 1997, 2 June 1998, 24 August 1999, 5 November 1999, 25 February 2000, 12 May 2000, 31 October 2000, 23 February 2001, 28 September 2001, 16 November 2001, 25 January 2002, 13 September 2002, 26 October 2004, 11 February 2005, 14 September 2007, 3 February 2009)
 Pavel Nedved (7 April 2000, 5 February 2002, 8 November 2002, 18 April 2003, 31 October 2003, 19 October 2004, 17 December 2004, 1 November 2005)
 Cristiano Ronaldo (24 February 2006, 26 September 2006, 20 October 2006, 29 December 2006, 14 August 2007, 13 November 2007, 18 January 2008, 6 June 2008, 16 December 2008, 3 March 2009, 23 September 2010, 18 October 2010, 27 June 2013, 5 February 2015, 31 July 2018, 17 August 2018, 31 August 2018) 
 Alessandro Nesta (7 December 1999, 15 February 2002)
 David Trezeguet (8 December 2000, 22 February 2002, 4 April 2003, 30 January 2004, 17 January 2006)
 Roberto Baggio (26 January 1999, 4 February 2000, 3 November 2000)
 Gianluigi Buffon (7 September 1999, 29 October 1999, 17 January 2003, 9 May 2003, 12 March 2004, 10 March 2016, 4 June 2016, 3 April 2018)
 Hernan Crespo (5 March 1999, 13 April 1999, 14 July 2000, 16 March 2001, 23 November 2001, 20 September 2002, 7 November 2003, 30 July 2004, 25 February 2005)
 Christian Vieri (26 June 1998, 27 August 1999, 7 December 2001, 8 March 2002, 10 January 2003, 11 April 2003)
 Andriy Shevchenko (8 October 1999, 26 October 1999, 30 April 2004, 27 August 2004)
 Paolo Maldini (13 March 2001, 3 August 2001, 22 November 2002)
 David Beckham (March 1997, 13 November 1998, 6 August 1999, 31 December 1999, 18 January 2002, 8 January 2010)
 Thierry Henry (14 April 2000, 21 August 2001, 15 April 2003, 26 March 2004, 10 December 2004)
 Francesco Totti (10 September 1999, 19 November 1999, 10 October 2000, 2 March 2001, 8 June 2001, 12 April 2002, 7 March 2003, 25 April 2003, 5 March 2004, 28 September 2007)
 Filippo Inzaghi (November 1997, 8 May 1998, 6 November 1998, 16 February 2001, 21 September 2001, 21 March 2003, 3 October 2003)
 Ronaldinho (19 November 2004, 22 February 2005, 25 April 2006, 5 December 2006, 20 February 2007, 11 July 2008)
 Dennis Bergkamp (18 December 1998, 10 August 1999, 26 October 1999, 5 April 2002)
 Marc Overmars (29 January 1999, 26 September 2000)
 Zinedine Zidane (May 1997, September 1997, 3 July 1998, 31 March 2000, 4 May 2001)
 Oliver Kahn (20 November 2001, 1 October 2002, 18 October 2005)

References

External links 
  

Publications established in 1984
1984 establishments in Indonesia
Sports mass media in Indonesia
Sports newspapers
Indonesian-language newspapers
Mass media in Jakarta
Publications disestablished in 2018
2018 disestablishments in Indonesia
Defunct newspapers published in Indonesia
Kompas Gramedia Group